Romvong (also romanized as Rom Vong or Roam Vong), Lamvong (Lao: ລຳວົງ - lám wóŋ) or Ramwong (Tai Lue: ᩃ᪁ ᩴᩅ ᩫ ᩬ; Tai Khun: ᨽ᩠ᨿᨦᨴᩱ᩠ᨿᩃᩨᩢ;), Rambung) is a type of Southeast Asian dance where both females and males dance in a circle. It is a popular folk-dance in Xishuangbanna (China), Cambodia, Laos, Malaysia and Thailand. It is a slow round dance continuously moving in a circular manner, and incorporates graceful hand movements and simple footwork. Both men and women participate in the same circle.

The circular dance style is claimed as a traditional dance in the four countries of the region where it is often part of traditional festivities, popular celebrations and modern parties. In addition to the dominate Khmer, Lao, Malay and Thai cultures, romvong is also common among many other groups indigenous to Southeast Asia. In Cambodia, for example, Ramvong dance is also found among ethnic groups including the Phnong, Krung, Tampuan and Brao people.

Etymology
Romvong, sometimes transliterated as ramvong, is from the Khmer word .

History
It is suggested that romvong is derived from Tai Lue people from Xishuangbanna, China. 
Romvong is very popular among other Mon-Khmer indigenous people known as Khmer Ler, which has nothing to do with those tribes mentioned after, such as Kroeng, Phnong, Tampuan, etc. All ethnic Khmers including Northern Khmer (Thailand), Khmer Kandal (Cambodia), and Khmer Krom (Southern Vietnam) as well as other Mon-Khmer tribes used the same word "roamvong" for this type of dance as a unified Khmer identity.

The indigenous Mon-Khmer minority known as Khmer Ler, who are called those khmer living in higher latitude land only, inhabited Northeastern Cambodia and other mountainous region in mainland Southeast Asia popularly dance circling the campfire at night. This dancing (romvong) dates for millenniums. In the Leang Arak rituals or Lerng Nak Ta which was the original Khmer tradition before Hinduism and Buddhism introduced to ancient Cambodia, small shrine was built surrounded with religious fence, where the spiritual women dance around the shrine. Then romvong become more popular for the locals dancing for entertainment and celebrations.

Romvong was probably performed by the Khmer locals during New Year celebration and festivities during Khmer Empire, and later on adopted by other Tai settlers, the ancestor of modern Thais and Laos when settling in Khmer Empire territories, based on the writer's opinion.

Description
The basic pattern involves two couples folding their palms, with their fingers at right angles to their wrists, and bringing the hands up from behind the body to in front of the face, straightening and bending the fingers in time to the music throughout. The hands move in opposition directions, one to the left and one to the right.

The legs must move in time of the rhythm, and in the opposite direction of the partner. Dancers continue around in a circle, keeping in time with the beat of the drum. There is often a decorated pole or a vase of flowers used to mark the center of the circle.

Importance in Cambodia
As Romvong originated from Khmer pre-historical tradition, this type of folk dance is very popular in Cambodia as this type of slow dance is regarded as Khmer national identity and local folklore.

Romvong is the most popular folk dance perform by both men and women across Cambodia especially in the New Year Eve, national and religious celebrations, and occasional events. Khmer people performs romvong for entertainment, releasing stress, and happiness. This type of dance is easily learned and perform, that's why most Khmer people regardless of social status know how to perform it. Moreover, Romvong songs are very popular among Khmer people sing during Khmer New Year (Sankrata), and other festivities especially during local celebrations.

Importance in Thailand

In Thailand ramvong is deemed to have originated in ramthon, an older kind of folk dance where the rhythm was marked by a kind of drum known as thon. The Fine Arts Department of Thailand has identified over ten different styles of ramvong.

Ramvong was patronized by Prime Minister Plaek Phibunsongkhram during the hard times of Thailand in World War II. In order to help people to forget their penury, the military dictator encouraged Thai women and men to enjoy themselves by dancing ramvong. Also, as part of the policy of Thaification during his tenure, Phibunsongkhram aimed to stem the popularity of non-Thai dances such as the foxtrot or waltz through the promotion of ramvong. Even government officials were given half a day during the work week to dance ramvong together at their offices. After the end of World War II ramvong was largely replaced by luk thung and cha-cha-cha although its influence survived in Thai society.

See also
Khmer classical dance
Dance of Cambodia
Culture of Cambodia
Dance in Thailand

References

External links
Leisure Cambodia: Popular Khmer Dances
Photo of ramvong circle (Laos)
CulturalProfiles.net: "Fon phun muang - Lao folk dance".
Thai Women: Changing Status and Roles

Asian dances
Cambodian culture
Partner dance
Cambodian music
Laotian culture
Malaysian culture
Thai dance
Thai culture
Cultural history of Thailand